Talisman is the self-titled first studio album by hard rock band Talisman, released in 1990 through Airplay/Vinylmania. It has been reissued three times: first in 1993 through Dino Music; followed by a remastered edition in 2003 through Dino/Empire Records, containing a bonus disc with demos and live recordings from 1990; and once again on September 12, 2012, as a deluxe Digipak edition with further bonus material.

Track listing

Personnel
Jeff Scott Soto – vocals
Christopher Ståhl – guitar
Mats Lindfors – guitar, mixing
Marcel Jacob – guitar, keyboard, drums (except tracks 6, 8), bass, mixing
Mats Olausson – keyboard
Peter Hermansson – drums (tracks 6, 8)
Lennart Östlund – mixing
Peter Dahl – mastering
Micke Lind – remastering

References

Talisman (band) albums
1990 albums